Antonio Simone (born 1969) is an Italian pianist, composer and recording artist. He shifted from a classical musical style to a neoclassical new age style in the early 21st Century with albums such as Life Colours.

Discography
 Life Colours (2010)
 Step by Step (2012)
 Piano Collection Vol. 1 (2012)
 Nothing Lasts Forever (2014)

Awards and nominations

External links
Antonio Simone's Official Website
 Antonio Simone discography at Discogs

1969 births
Living people
Italian male classical composers
Italian classical composers
Composers for piano
20th-century classical composers
21st-century classical composers
New-age pianists
New-age musicians
20th-century Italian composers
Italian male pianists
21st-century pianists
20th-century Italian male musicians
21st-century Italian male musicians